The city of Dnipro is located at confluence of Dnieper and Samara rivers.

References

 
Transport infrastructure in Dnipro
Dnipro
Lists of buildings and structures in Ukraine
Ukraine transport-related lists
Dnipro